Saint Patiens was the fourth Bishop of Metz, later being made patron of the city. He died in the fourth century.

References

Gallo-Roman saints
4th-century deaths
4th-century Christian saints
4th-century bishops in Gaul
Year of birth unknown
Bishops of Metz